The Lindenwood Lady Lions represent Lindenwood University. The 2012–13 Lindenwood Lady Lions ice hockey season was the team's tenth season and their second season as a member of the National Collegiate Athletic Association (NCAA). The team is coached by Vince O'Mara and they play their home games at Lindenwood Ice Arena. The 2012-13 season is Lindenwood's first as a member of College Hockey America, after the team competed as an NCAA Division I independent program in 2011–12 season.

Offseason
 July 2, 2012: Cory Whitaker joined the program as a goalie/video coach. Prior to joining the Lindenwood coaching staff, Whitaker coached five seasons for Grand Valley State's American Collegiate Hockey Association Division I women's ice hockey team where he led the Lakers to the ACHA national tournament three times in five years. Whitaker was the goaltender for the GVSU men's ACHA Division II team from 1996-2001. During his time at Grand Valley State, he recorded a .903 save percentage and played more than 2,700 minutes. In 2001, he was named to the first-team all-conference.
July 14, 2012: Lindenwood was granted provisional status by the NCAA in July 2012. During the provisional year, the university will follow all NCAA regulations but will not be eligible for postseason NCAA competition.

Recruiting
Lindenwood announced its second NCAA recruiting class on May 3, 2012. The 2012-13 recruiting class includes six incoming freshman and two transfers:

Regular season

Lindenwood Statistics Nationally
Lindenwood University Statistics

Rankings 
Lindenwood University Rankings

Schedule

Note: All times are Central.

References

Lindenwood
2012-13 Lindenwood Lady Lions women's ice hockey season
Lindenwood
Lindenwood